Carlo Grante (born 1960 in L'Aquila) is an Italian classical pianist. Later he also studied with Ivan Davis, Rudolf Firkušný, and Alisa Kezheradze. He is known as a performer of mainstream classical composers such as Franz Liszt, Wolfgang Amadeus Mozart, and Domenico Scarlatti, as well as highly demanding late romantic and 20th-century composers such as Leopold Godowsky, Ferruccio Busoni, George Flynn, Roman Vlad, Michael Finnissy, Alistair Hinton, and Kaikhosru Shapurji Sorabji. His discography consists of more than 50 albums.

Biography 

Grante graduated in piano at the Conservatory St. Cecilia in Rome with Sergio Perticaroli, then he studied in the U.S. with Ivan Davis, at the University of Miami and with Rudolf Firkusny at the Juilliard School in New York; he then moved to London, where he studied intensively with Alisa Kezheradze-Pogorelić.

Grante is one of the most active among today's recording pianists and his concert repertoire, which has also contributed to the appreciation of lesser-known works. His discography currently numbers more than fifty CDs, ranging from Domenico Scarlatti (the complete recording of the sonatas is taking place in Vienna—a project of about 40 CDs under the patronage of Bösendorfer and Paul and Eva Badura-Skoda), Platti, Clementi, Liszt and Schumann, to twentieth-century composers as Godowsky, Busoni and Sorabji. His recent record productions include works by Roman Vlad (Opus Triplex) and Finnissy (Bachsche Nachdichtungen) dedicated to him and inspired by Bach and Busoni, the two concertos for piano and orchestra by Franz Schmidt with the MDR Leipzig Radio Symphony Orchestra conducted by Fabio Luisi, three concertos for piano and orchestra by Mozart with the Orchestra dell'Accademia di Santa Cecilia in Rome conducted by Bernhard Sieberer, the Busoni Concerto, recorded live in Vienna with the Vienna Symphony conducted by Fabio Luisi, the three sonatas by Schumann (recorded in the Sala Santa Cecilia in Rome's Parco della Musica), as well as works by Godowsky, Rachmaninoff, Flynn, Bloch and Liszt.

In his concert activity he has performed in major concert venues and prestigious halls: the Grosser Saal of the Konzerthaus and Goldener Saal of the Musikverein in Vienna, Wigmore Hall and Barbican Hall in London, at the Parco della Musica in Rome, Leipzig Gewandhaus, Dresden Semperoper, Staatsoper Stuttgart, in New York, Chicago, Milan, Moscow, Hong Kong, Singapore, Hanoi, Zagreb, Bucharest, Lima, Rio de Janeiro, the Vienna Festival, Istanbul, Husum, Newport, Neuhaus Festival in Saratov, Miami, Tallinn, Ravello, MDR Musiksommer, etc., with major orchestras, such as Staatskapelle Dresden, Royal Philharmonic Orchestra in London, Vienna Symphony, Orchestra of St. Cecilia, Orchestra i Pomeriggi Musicali in Milan, Orchestra of Radio-TV in Zagreb, MDR Leipzig Radio Symphony Orchestra, Cappella Istropolitana of Bratislava, Chamber Orchestra of Europe, etc. Grante has also written scholarly articles regarding research into methodology and piano literature.

At the Newport Music Festival in 1995, Grante performed the world premiere of the 53 Studies on the Études of Chopin by Leopold Godowsky. In 1996, on the occasion of two recitals at Wigmore Hall in London, a Musical Opinion reviewer wrote: "The discs of Grante had shown astonishing qualities... his live performances have then proved him to be the first rate pianist that his discs suggested."

In 1997 he gave a series of six recitals in New York.

He performed again at the Newport Music Festival in 2011 and 2012.

Discography 

Busoni: Works for Piano and Orchestra, Orchestra dei Pomeriggi musicali di Milano, Music & Arts CD-1047
Piano works by Busoni, Bloch, Finnissy & Flynn, Music & Arts CD-1247
Busoni, Troncon – P. Troncon: 6 Preludes and Fugues F. Busoni: Prélude et Etude; Fantasia nach Bach; Vivace e Leggero; Perpetuum mobile, Music & Arts CD-1157
Busoni, Vlad – Busoni: Fantasia Contrappuntistica, Roman Vlad: Opus Triplex, Music & Arts CD-1186-1
Muzio Clementi – The Sonatas for Solo Piano, Vol. 1, Altarus
Leopold Godowsky Edition, Vol. 1 – Passacaglia; 12 Schubert Song Transcriptions, Music & Arts CD-984
Godowsky Edition, Vol. 2 – Bach Violin Sonatas Transcriptions, Music & Arts CD-1039
Godowsky Edition, Vol. 3 – Bach Cello Suites Transcriptions, Music & Arts CD-1046
Godowsky Edition, Vol. 4 – Studies on Chopin's Etudes, Music & Arts CD-1093
Godowsky Edition, Vol. 5 – Transcriptions from Weber, Schumann, Chopin, Music & Arts CD-1189
Godowsky Edition, Vol. 6 – "Renaissance" Transcriptions, Music & Arts CD-1215
Godowsky Edition, Vol. 7 – Transcriptions and Paraphrases, Albeniz to Richard Strauss, Music & Arts CD-1259
Godowsky Studies on Chopin's Etudes Vol. 1, Studien über die Etüden von Chopin Nos. 1–20, Altarus Air CD 9092
Godowsky Studies on Chopin's Etudes Vol. 2, Studien über die Etüden von Chopin Nos. 21–43, Altarus Air CD 9093
Godowsky Studies on Chopin's Etudes Vol. 3, Studien über die Etüden von Chopin Nos. 44–48, Passacaglia, 4 Chopin Waltz transcriptions, Altarus Air CD 9094
Giovanni Benedetto Platti
Platti – Sonatas Vol. 1, Sonatas 1–4, Dante PSG9647
Platti – Sonatas Vol. 2, Sonatas 5–8, Dante PSG9648
Platti – Sonatas Vol. 3, Sonatas 9–13, Dante PSG9651
Liszt, Busoni, Sorabji – Liszt: Norma Fantasy, Don Juan Fantasy, Busoni: Sonatina super Carmen, Sorabji: Carmen Pastiche, Altarus Air CD
Franz Liszt – Via crucis, Harmonies poétiques et religieuses
Carlo Grante Live in New York – Liszt: Mazeppa, Sonata, Bach-Busoni: Chaconne
Wolfgang Amadeus Mozart – Concerto K. 449 – Concerto K. 488 – Concerto K. 365 (Orchestra dell’Accademia di Santa Cecilia, Rome; B. Sieberer, cond.; Barbara Panzarella, piano II in K. 365), Music & Arts CD-1222
Poulenc; Saint-Saëns; Elliot – Music for Woodwinds and Piano, Altarus Air CD 9032
Sergei Rachmaninoff – Preludes Op. 32, Corelli Variations, Isle of the Dead (transcr. G. Kirkor) Music & Arts CD-1128
Scarlatti – Domenico Scarlatti, Vol. 1 (6 CDs, 90 Sonatas), 30 Essercizi, Parma book I: Sonatas 1–30, Parma book II: Sonatas 1–30, Music & Arts CD-1236
Scarlatti – Domenico Scarlatti, Vol. 2 (6 CDs, 90 Sonatas), Parma book III: Sonatas 1–30, Parma book IV: Sonatas 1–30, Parma book V: Sonatas 1–30, Music & Arts CD-1242
Franz Schmidt –  Concertante Variations for piano (left hand) and orchestra, Concerto in E-flat major German Radio Orchestra, MDR Leipzig, Fabio Luisi, cond. Querstand VKJK 0611
Robert Schumann – Three Piano Sonatas, Sonata, Op. 11, Sonata, Op. 14, Sonata, Op. 22 Music & Arts CD-1120
Roman Vlad – Major piano works Cantata No. 3, "Le ciel est vide" Santa Cecilia Academy Chorus and Orchestra, Giuseppe Sinopoli, cond. Music & Arts CD-1217
Maria Hofer – Toccata (piano solo) Ballada, for violoncello and piano (with Euden Prochak) Lieder (with Patrizia Cigna, Wolf Matthias Friedrich)(noncommercial compilation)
Wolfgang Amadeus Mozart – Twelve Variations on "Ah vous dirai-je, Maman" (noncommercial compilation)

Publications 
Appunti di studio – 6 capolavori pianistici (in progress)
Criteri primari di metodologia pianistica, Rugginenti Editori, Milano, 2012 . English Fundamentals of Piano Methodology (2013),

Bibliography 

Roberto Piana, Around the Piano. Appunti intorno al pianoforte, Magnum Edizioni, Sassari, 2001
Roberto Piana incontra Carlo Grante, Editoriale Documenta, Cargeghe, 2009

References

External links
 

Italian classical pianists
Male classical pianists
Italian male pianists
Living people
University of Miami alumni
1960 births
21st-century classical pianists
21st-century Italian male musicians